The Rocket Man is a 1954 American comedy science fiction film directed by Oscar Rudolph and starring Charles Coburn, Spring Byington, Anne Francis, John Agar and George "Foghorn" Winslow. The script was co-written by Lenny Bruce and Jack Henley from a story by George W. George and George F. Slavin. A comedy with science fiction overtones, the film carries the tag line, “Out-of-this-world laughter and down-to-earth charm when the face from space turns out to be… the kid next door!”

The New York Times found the fact that comedian Lenny Bruce was one of the film's screenwriters was the "strangest aspect of the low-budget production", noting that the film contains little of Bruce's trademark humor.

Plot
As a result of the sudden and unexplained appearance of a mysterious rocket man, a little boy comes into possession of a mysterious ray gun that compels anyone caught in its beam to tell the truth. He uses it to prevent his orphanage from being foreclosed upon by creditors and to help a young couple fall in love.

Cast
 Charles Coburn as Mayor Ed Johnson
 Spring Byington as Justice Amelia Brown
 Anne Francis as June Brown
 John Agar as Tom Baxter
 George Winslow as Timmy (as George "Foghorn" Winslow)
 Stanley Clements as Bob
 Emory Parnell as Big Bill Watkins
 June Clayworth as Harriet Snedley
 Don Haggerty as Officer Mike O'Brien
 Beverly Garland as Ludine

References

External links
 
 

1954 films
1954 comedy films
Lenny Bruce
1950s science fiction comedy films
American black-and-white films
American science fiction comedy films
1950s English-language films
1950s American films